Pivnichne, formerly Kirove, is an urban-type settlement in the Bakhmut Raion, Donetsk Oblast (province) of eastern Ukraine. Population: 

In 2016, Kirove was renamed to Pivnichne, conforming to the law prohibiting names of Communist origin.

Demographics
Native language as of the Ukrainian Census of 2001:
 Ukrainian 8.39%
 Russian 91.37%
 Armenian 0.08%
 Belarusian 0.05%
 Bulgarian, Polish, Hungarian and Gagauz 0.01%

References

Urban-type settlements in Bakhmut Raion